Magomadas is a comune (municipality) in the Province of Oristano in the Italian region Sardinia, located about  northwest of Cagliari and about  north of Oristano.

Geography
Magomadas borders the following municipalities: Bosa, Flussio, Modolo, Tresnuraghes.

History
The village was presumably founded by Phoenicians. The name Macomades is born by many ancient settlements around the coast of the western Mediterranean Sea. In Hebrew, of all contemporary semitic languages the most closely related to ancient Phoenician, maqom ħadaš means "new place".

References

Cities and towns in Sardinia